You Better Ask Somebody is the third studio album by the American West Coast hip-hop artist, Yo-Yo. The album was released on June 22, 1993, through East West America and Atlantic Records, and featured production by Ice Cube, N.W.A producer Laylaw, the Baker Boys, Derrick McDowell, Mister Woody, and Tootie. The album peaked at number 107 on the Billboard 200 and number 21 on the Top R&B/Hip-Hop Albums. There were two singles from the album that charted, including "Westside Story", which reached number 14 on the Hot Rap Singles, and "The Bonnie and Clyde Theme", which peaked at the number 1 spot on Hot Rap Singles and featured Ice Cube.

Track listing

Sample credits
"IBWin' Wit My Crewin'" samples "Buckwilin'" performed by Terminator X.
"Can You Handle It?" samples "Welcome to the Terrordome" performed by Public Enemy.
"Westside Story" samples "Sir Nose D'Voidoffunk" performed by Parliament.
"Mackstress" samples "Do That Stuff" performed by Parliament, "Top Billin'" performed by Audio Two and "Sing a Simple Song" performed by Sly and the Family Stone.
"They Shit Don't Stink" samples "Get Off Your Ass and Jam" performed by Funkadelic and "Stoned Is the Way of Walk" performed by Cypress Hill.
"Letter To The Pen" samples "Nuthin' but a 'G' Thang" performed by Dr. Dre, "Impeach the President" performed by The Honey Drippers, and "La Di Da Di" performed by Doug E. Fresh and MC Ricky D.
"Givin' It Up" samples "Just Funnin'" performed by Mtume and "Baby" performed by Cheryl Lynn.
"Pass It On" samples "Stoned Is the Way of Walk" performed by Cypress Hill, "Poison" performed by Bell Biv DeVoe, and "Give Me Some Emotion" performed by Webster Lewis.
"Girls Got A Gun" samples "Raw" performed by Big Daddy Kane, "Run Nigger" performed by The Last Poets, and "Shotgun" performed by Los Lobos.
"The Bonnie and Clyde Theme" samples "Master Rocker" performed by Bernard Wright.

Personnel
Adapted from the album's liner notes.

 Tony Dawsey – mastering (Masterdisk)
 Thomas Bricker – art direction
 Michael Miller – photography
 Lisa Michelle – fashion stylist

Charts

References

External links
 

1993 albums
Yo-Yo (rapper) albums
East West Records albums
Albums produced by Laylaw
Albums produced by Quincy Jones III